Iris kolpakowskiana, or Kolpakowski's iris, is a plant species in the genus Iris, it is classified in the subgenus Hermodactyloides and section Monolepsis. It is a bulbous perennial from Asia.

Description
It has a bulb covered with a densely reticulate fibrous tunics.

It has 3–4 leaves, which are similar to many irises of the genus Scorpiris, although it has only a few leaves at flowering time.

They are 0.2 cm wide and ribbed on the underside.

It blooms in late winter, between March, and April.

The flowers are bi-tone (2 coloured), they come in purple shades, from reddish-violet, lilac-violet, pale lilac to pale purple.

Like other irises, it has 2 pairs of petals, 3 large sepals (outer petals), known as the 'falls' and 3 inner, smaller petals (or tepals), known as the 'standards'. They are dark violet, purple, or dark reddish purple, with a yellow, or yellow orange ridge.

It has stamens with filaments that are 0.5–0.9 cm long.

After the iris has flowered, it produces a cylindrical with a short beak seed capsule.

Biochemistry
As most irises are diploid, having two sets of chromosomes, this can be used to identify hybrids and classification of groupings. It was counted as 2n=20.

Taxonomy
It is pronounced as (Iris) EYE-ris (kolpakowskiana) kol-pa-kow-skee-AY-nuh.
It is sometimes known as 'Kolpakowski's Iris'.

It is sometimes mis-spelt as  Iris kolpakowskyana. It was named after the  first Russian military Governor of Semirechye Oblast in modern Kazakhstan . See also Sun Tulip or Kolpakowski Tulip.

The iris was first described by Eduard August von Regel in the Botanical Magazine No.6489 in 1880.Iris kolpakowskiana'' is now an accepted name by the RHS, and was verified by United States Department of Agriculture and the Agricultural Research Service on 2 October 2014.

Distribution and habitat
It is native to temperate Asia.

Range
It is found in the Tien Shan Mountains, Turkestan.
It is also found in Kazakhstan, Uzbekistan, and Kyrgyzstan.

Habitat
It grows on the hillsides, and open grassy slopes, in wet sticky clay that dries out in summer.

Conservation
It was on the 1997 IUCN Red List of Threatened Plants.

References

Other sources
Czerepanov, S. K. 1995. Vascular plants of Russia and adjacent states (the former USSR). (referred to as Iridodictyum kolpakowskianum (Regel) Rodion)
Komarov, V. L. et al., eds. 1934–1964. Flora SSSR. 
Mathew, B. 1981. The Iris. 177.

External links
 
 

kolpakowskiana
Plants described in 1877
Flora of Kyrgyzstan
Flora of Kazakhstan
Flora of Uzbekistan